Jesper Odelberg (born 23 July 1970) is a Swedish sit-down comedian with cerebral palsy.

His appearance on Norwegian television in 2006 with his band, Boys on Wheels, brought him wider fame, when it appeared on various Internet video sharing sites.
Njjnn
His big breakthrough was 1997 in the TV show “Släng dig i brunnen”. He is known for being very self-exposing and often jokes about Cerebral Palsy, CP, since he suffers from it himself.

He is brother to the songwriter and artist Joakim Odelberg and he has a sister named Pia Emanuelsson.

Jesper's first stand-up performance was in Ljungskile October 1992 and started working professionally as a comedian 1995.

He worked at Backa Teater in Gothenburg during 1994-1998 as a production assistant.

Jesper has toured throughout Sweden, Norway and Finland since 1995. He has also toured as a folk singer together with the pianist Thomas Darelid.

In 1998, Jesper did 70 shows performing the “Den onde, den gode och den fule” with Thomas Oredsson, Jan Bylund and Håkan Jäder under the direction of the Swedish National Theater.

References

External links 

 Official site
 

1970 births
Living people
Swedish male comedians
Swedish stand-up comedians
20th-century Swedish comedians
21st-century Swedish comedians
People with cerebral palsy